Three warships of Sweden have been named Uttern, after Uttern:

 , a warship launched in 1672 and stricken in 1681–1682.
 , a  launched in 1918 and stricken in 1944.
 , a  launched in 1958 and stricken in 1980.

Swedish Navy ship names